Lakas ng Bayan, abbreviated as Laban, was a political party in the Philippines formed by Senator Benigno "Ninoy" Aquino Jr. for the 1978 Interim Batasang Pambansa regional elections. The party had 21 candidates for the Metro Manila area, all of whom lost, including Ninoy. The party's acronym (LABAN) is a Filipino word meaning "fight".

After Aquino's exile to the United States, the party was managed by the brother of Aquino's wife, Jose "Peping" Cojuangco Jr.

By 1984, the party had formed a coalition with the Partido Demokratiko Pilipino of Aquilino Pimentel Jr., himself a LABAN party member. By 1986, the two parties were completely merged to form the Partido Demokratiko Pilipino–Lakas ng Bayan party or PDP–Laban.

The name "Lakas ng Bayan" would eventually be reused in the 1987 Philippine legislative elections as the name of a coalition led by the United Nationalist Democratic Organization party of President Corazon C. Aquino and Vice President Salvador H. Laurel.

Noise barrage

On April 6, 1978, supporters of the party came out in protest by asking bystanders and cars to make noise in support of the opposition. However, on April 7, 1978, the first national election under martial law held for the 165- members to the Interim Batasang Pambansa resulted in the massive victory of the administration coalition party, the “Kilusang Bagong Lipunan ng Nagkakaisang Nacionalista, Liberal, at iba pa” or KBL. Only 15 opposition candidates in other parts of the country won. None of the members of LABAN  were elected. The opposition denounced the massive vote buying and cheating in that elections. On June 12, 1978, the Interim Batasang Pambansa was convened with Marcos as President-Prime Minister and Querube Makalintal as Speaker.

Some opposition members went into exile or were driven underground fighting against the Marcos dictatorship. Labor leader Alex Boncayao became guerrilla and was killed by government security forces in 1983.

Electoral performance
As LABAN was a coalition, the results below are combined totals of the parties under LABAN.

Candidates - 1978 Interim Batasang Pambansa

References

Defunct political parties in the Philippines
Political parties established in 1978
Political parties disestablished in 1986
1978 establishments in the Philippines
1986 disestablishments in the Philippines